Willard Lewis Waterman (August 29, 1914 – February 2, 1995) was an American character actor in films, TV and on radio, remembered best for replacing Harold Peary as the title character of The Great Gildersleeve at the height of that show's popularity.

Early years
In the mid-1930s, Waterman attended the University of Wisconsin, where he joined Theta Chi, acted in student plays, and was a friend of Uta Hagen. His growing interest in theater put an end to his original plan to be an engineer, and he gained experience in radio at the university's station, WHA.

Radio
Waterman began his radio career at WIBA in Madison, singing in a quartet that performed "musical interludes between programs," and came to NBC in Chicago in early 1936.

Waterman replaced Harold Peary on The Great Gildersleeve in 1950, after Peary was unable to convince sponsor and show owner Kraft Cheese to allow him an ownership stake in the show. Impressed with better capital-gains deals CBS was willing to offer performers in the high-tax late 1940s, he decided to move from NBC to CBS during the latter's famous talent raids. Kraft, however, refused to move the show to CBS and hired Waterman to replace Peary as the stentorian Throckmorton P. Gildersleeve.

There he met and replaced Peary on The Tom Mix Ralston Straight Shooters. Not only did the two men become longtime friends, but Waterman—who actually looked as though he could have been Peary's sibling, and whose voice was a near-match for Peary's—refused to appropriate the half-leering, half-embarrassed laugh Peary had made a Gildersleeve trademark. He stayed with The Great Gildersleeve from 1950 to 1957 on radio and in a short-lived television series syndicated in 1955.

During World War II, Waterman worked in war production  in the Nash-Kelvinator plant in Kenosha, Wisconsin.

At the same time he was heard as Gildersleeve, Waterman had a recurring role as Mr. Merriweather in the short-lived but respected radio comedy vehicle for Ronald Colman and his wife Benita Hume, The Halls of Ivy. Waterman's pre-Gildersleeve radio career, in addition to Tom Mix, had included at least one starring vehicle, a short-lived situation comedy, Those Websters, that premiered in 1945.

He had radio roles between the mid-1930s and 1950 on such shows as Chicago Theater of the Air (variety) and Harold Teen (comedy), plus four soap operas: Girl Alone, The Guiding Light, Lonely Women, The Road of Life and Kay Fairchild, Stepmother.

Film
Waterman is remembered for his role as Claude Upson in the 1958 film Auntie Mame. He was also seen in Riding High, Three Coins in the Fountain, and The Apartment.

Stage
Waterman was in two Broadway productions of the musical Mame (the 1966 original and the 1983 revival) and the 1973 Broadway revival of The Pajama Game. He also toured in the national companies of How to Succeed in Business Without Really Trying and A Funny Thing Happened on the Way to the Forum.

Television
Waterman's later career included a variety of film and TV supporting roles on such shows as a short-lived television adaptation of The Great Gildersleeve, Vacation Playhouse, Lawman, My Favorite Martian, Bat Masterson, The Eve Arden Show (four episodes from 1957 to 1958 as Carl Foster), 77 Sunset Strip, Bonanza, The Dick Van Dyke Show, Guestward Ho!, F Troop, and Dennis the Menace, in which he  played the lovable grocer, Mr. Quigley. Between 1957 and 1959, he appeared five times as Mac Maginnis in the ABC sitcom The Real McCoys starring Walter Brennan.

Waterman was all but retired from acting after 1973, although in 1980 he appeared in the "Boss and Peterson" radio commercial for Sony, for which he received a Clio Award.

Labor activities
In 1937, Waterman was a founding member of the radio union known as the American Federation of Television and Radio Artists. One obituary noted, "He was believed to be the only person to have served as a member of the union's board of directors in four different locales: Chicago, Los Angeles, San Francisco and New York."

Death
Waterman died of bone marrow disease February 2, 1995, at his home in Burlingame, California, and is interred at Skylawn Memorial Park in San Mateo, California. He was survived by his wife, Mary Anna (née Theleen), two daughters, three granddaughters, and a great-granddaughter.

Recognition
Waterman has a star in the Radio section of the Hollywood Walk of Fame.

Filmography

Radio appearances

References

External links

Obituary: The New York Times

1914 births
1995 deaths
20th-century American male actors
Actors from Madison, Wisconsin
American male film actors
American male radio actors
American male stage actors
American male television actors
Deaths from bone cancer
Deaths from cancer in California
Male actors from Wisconsin
Male actors from Los Angeles
University of Wisconsin–Madison alumni